Jeong Gongchae (December 22 1934 - April 30, 2008) was a South Korean contemporary poet.

Biography
Jeong Gongchae was born in Hadong County, South Gyeongsang Province in 1934. He studied Political Science at Yonsei University, and made his literary debut in the magazine Hyundae Munhak with three poems: "Jong-i unda", "Yeojin", and "Haneul-gwa adeul".

Career

Notable events
 1957 Debuted in Hyundae Munhak
 1963 Published the poem "Mi 8-gun-ui cha"
 1979 Published the poetry collection Do You Have a Poetry Collection by Jeong Gongchae?
 1981 Published the poetry collection Haejeom
 1986 Published the poetry collection Arirang
 1986 Published the poetry collection Let's Get Wet in the Rain
 1986 Published the poetry collection A Critical Biography of Jeon Hye-rin
 1989 Published the poetry collection Aesop's Fables
 1989 Published the poetry collection The Sounds of People
 1990 Published the poetry collection Writing on the Ground
 2000 Published the poetry collection New Excellence

Awards
 1959 5th Contemporary Literature (Hyundae Munhak) Award - for "Coal" and "Freedom"
 1981 1st Korean Literature Association Award
 2004 41st Korean Literature Award

Works
 Do You Have a Poetry Collection by Jeong Gongchae? (1979)
 Haejeom (1981)
 Arirang (1986)
 Let's Get Wet in the Rain (1986)
 A Critical Biography of Jeon Hye-rin (1986)
 Aesop's Fables (1989)
 The Sounds of People (1989)
 From Your Morning to My Evening: An Essay Collection (1989)
 Writing on the Ground (1990)
 New Excellence (2000)

Family
 Jeong Dusu (younger brother) - lyricist and poet

References

South Korean male poets
2008 deaths
1934 births
People from Hadong County